Let's Talk is a debut EP from Canadian actor Tyler Kyte.

Track listing
Let's Talk (Tyler Kyte/Jesse Labelle)  – 4:14
What You Need (T. Kyte/Dave Thomson)  – 3:48
Sarah (T. Kyte)  – 4:50
Some Things Are Better Left Alone (T. Kyte/D. Thomson)  – 4:06
Soft Spoken (T. Kyte)  – 4:24

Album credits
Produced by Dave Thomson
Guitars by Dan Kanter, Dave Thomson, Tyler Kyte
Bass by Morgan Waters, Dave Thomson
Drums by Gary Craig
Violin by Sarah McElravy
Additional vocals by Owen Carrier, Alexz Johnson, Dave Thomson, Jesse Labelle
Recorded at The Canterbury Music Co.
Engineered by Jeremy Darby
Additional recording at Rumblecone, engineered by Dave Thomson
Mixed by Mark Makoway
Executive produced by James Bryan
Photography and album art by Erin O'Connell
All songs copyright Tyler Kyte/Paintermind Publushing 2006

2006 EPs